Yakimov is a rural locality (a khutor) in Zakharkovsky Selsoviet Rural Settlement, Konyshyovsky District, Kursk Oblast, Russia. Population:

Geography 
The khutor is located in the Kotlevka River basin (a tributary of the Vablya in the basin of the Seym), 62.5 km from the Russia–Ukraine border, 60 km north-west of Kursk, 3 km east of the district center – the urban-type settlement Konyshyovka, 4.5 km from the selsoviet center – Zakharkovo.

 Climate
Yakimov has a warm-summer humid continental climate (Dfb in the Köppen climate classification).

Transport 
Yakimov is located 59 km from the federal route  Ukraine Highway, 44 km from the route  Crimea Highway, 43 km from the route  (Trosna – M3 highway), 26.5 km from the road of regional importance  (Fatezh – Dmitriyev), 2 km from the road  (Konyshyovka – Zhigayevo – 38K-038), 2 km from the road of intermunicipal significance  (38K-005 – Zakharkovo), 1 km from the road  (38K-005 – Dryomovo-Cheremoshki), 3 km from the nearest railway station Konyshyovka (railway line Navlya – Lgov-Kiyevsky).

The rural locality is situated 66 km from Kursk Vostochny Airport, 157 km from Belgorod International Airport and 268 km from Voronezh Peter the Great Airport.

References

Notes

Sources

Rural localities in Konyshyovsky District